Richard Nelson "Oz" Griebel (June 21, 1949 – July 29, 2020) was an American banker, lawyer, and political candidate. He ran as a Republican primary candidate in the 2010 Connecticut gubernatorial election, and as an independent in the 2018 gubernatorial election.

Early life and education
Richard Nelson Griebel was born in Camden, New Jersey. His nickname, "Oz", was a reference to his middle name being the same as the surname of the Nelson family on The Adventures of Ozzie and Harriet. Griebel graduated in 1971 with a Bachelor of Arts in English from Dartmouth College, where he played baseball and football for the Dartmouth Big Green. In 1970, he played collegiate summer baseball for the Harwich Mariners of the Cape Cod Baseball League, establishing a league record for innings pitched in a season with 110. Griebel also earned a Juris Doctor from Suffolk University in 1977. The Dartmouth baseball team represented New England in the 1970 College World Series.

Professional
Griebel was a teacher and coach at Worcester Academy. He served as CEO at BankBoston Connecticut from 1993 to 1999. Beginning in 2001, Griebel served as president and CEO of the MetroHartford Alliance, leading the economic development efforts of the Hartford region. Griebel sat on the corporate boards of MacDermid, Inc., Tallan, Inc., and World Business Capital. Griebel was named by the Hartford Courant and Hartford Business Journal as "Business Person of the Year" in 1995 and 2001, respectively.

Political career
Griebel announced his candidacy for Governor of Connecticut on January 28, 2010. After declaring his candidacy, Griebel met with thousands of Republican activists and participated in several debates and forums. Some of Griebel's opponents had focused on the fact that as a Republican candidate, he had made numerous donations to Democratic politicians, and as a result of this, his legitimacy as a Republican candidate for governor had been under scrutiny. His campaign's first television commercial began airing on April 23, 2010. In the Republican primary, held on August 10, 2010, Griebel lost the gubernatorial nomination to former ambassador to Ireland Tom Foley.

On December 21, 2017, Griebel announced that he would make an independent run for governor in 2018, along with his running mate Monte Frank, an attorney from Newtown, Connecticut. Griebel, at that juncture a former Republican was registered as Unaffiliated. Frank a former Democrat was registered as Unaffiliated. In the general election he placed in third behind Republican nominee Bob Stefanowski and winner Ned Lamont, the Democratic nominee. Griebel earned 3.89% of the vote and had been called a spoiler candidate for Stefanowski who lost narrowly to Lamont.

Civic participation
Griebel served on the boards of the Annual Fund of the United Way of the Central Naugatuck Valley, Bradley International Airport, the Connecticut Business and Industry Association, 
the Connecticut Transportation Strategy Board, Junior Achievement of Central Connecticut, the Mark Twain House, Northwest Catholic High School, Riverfront Recapture, the University of Hartford, the Wadsworth Atheneum, the Waterbury Foundation, and Yale-New Haven Hospital.

Personal life
Griebel resided in Hartford and had three children.

On July 21, 2020, Griebel was hit by a car while jogging in Pennsylvania. He died from complications of his injuries on July 29.

References

External links 
MetroHartford Alliance
Oz Griebel's campaign website

1949 births
2020 deaths
20th-century American businesspeople
21st-century American businesspeople
American bankers
Baseball players from New Jersey
Businesspeople from Hartford, Connecticut
Businesspeople from New Jersey
Candidates in the 2010 United States elections
Candidates in the 2018 United States elections
Connecticut Independents
Connecticut Republicans
Dartmouth Big Green baseball players
Dartmouth College alumni
Harwich Mariners players
Pedestrian road incident deaths
People from Camden, New Jersey
People from Simsbury, Connecticut
Players of American football from New Jersey
Road incident deaths in Pennsylvania
Schoolteachers from Massachusetts
Suffolk University Law School alumni